New Marske is a village in the unitary authority of Redcar and Cleveland and the ceremonial county of North Yorkshire, England, in the region of North East England. Roughly a mile south-west of Marske-by-the-Sea and set on a hillside, it was originally a group of miners' terraced houses.

1966 saw the development of what was originally known as Errington Park Estate the development of which ended in 1984.

New Marske has no railway station, but the closest, Longbeck railway station, links to Saltburn, Middlesbrough and Darlington. New Marske is situated near an area of woodland called Errington Woods, in which are the remains of disused mine workings. There are several farms in the vicinity, and there is a primary school (first opened in the 1970s to replace the old school house) The recent building of housing on the old primary school site has meant that the other school of the village has been extended to cater for the new children and closing of the old school. This new housing reflects the rapid growth of villages in the area.
There is a small row of shops known locally as the 'top shops' due to their position uphill from the older part of the village. This is generally considered the centre of the village.

Another set of shops is located at the northern end of the village, along with the three pubs that serve the surrounding area along with a Methodist church and a Church of England parish, St Thomas.

The original mining settlement has recently been commemorated, in the way of a series of plaques placed at various locations, depicting events and scenes of life in the 19th century. Remnants of the mining era remain in the way of disused shafts in Errington Woods. Some have been filled in or covered over, but some are still accessible.

New Marske is the birthplace of Johanna Jackson, the first British woman to win a major race walk title at the 2010 Commonwealth Games.

References

External links

 Listed buildings: Fell Briggs Farmhouse, Grewgrass Lane

Redcar and Cleveland
Places in the Tees Valley
Villages in North Yorkshire